The 1941 Hardin–Simmons Cowboys football team was an American football team that represented Hardin–Simmons University as a member of the Border Conference during the 1942 college football season. The team compiled a 7–3–1 record (3–1 against conference opponents), tied for third place in the conference, and outscored all opponents by a total of 178 to 88.

Three Hardin-Simmons players were selected by the conference coaches as first-team players on the 1941 All-Border Conference football team: quarterback Murray Evans; end H.C. Burrus; and tackle Truett Rattan.

Warren B. Woodson was in his first season as the team's head coach. Woodson was later inducted into the College Football Hall of Fame.

Schedule

References

Hardin-Simmons
Hardin–Simmons Cowboys football seasons
Hardin-Simmons Cowboys football